A telephone VoIP adapter (TVA), also called digital telephone adapter, is a device that allows digital PBX (Private branch exchange) telephone handsets to be connected to a VoIP network, using, for example, Session Initiation Protocol.

An ATA (analog telephone adapter) allows analog phones to be connected to VoIP networks.

A Centrex TVA VoIP enables centrex phones and analog-based Centrex phones like BT Featureline.

Some telecom manufacturers have produced hybrid exchanges with TVA-like elements that support IP phones and also have units or cards that allow connection of digital phones.

Whether a standalone TVA or a hybrid PBX is deployed, the intention is to preserve investment in an installed base of telephone handsets, and remove the need to install Ethernet network infrastructure.

References

Voice over IP
VoIP hardware